CMTU may refer to:

 Confederation of Malta Trade Unions
 Confederation of Mongolian Trade Unions